Rustica is a genus of moths of the family Erebidae erected by Michael Fibiger in 2008.

Species
Rustica pseudouncus Fibiger, 2008
Rustica nigrops Fibiger, 2008
Rustica basiprocessus Fibiger, 2008
Rustica dulcis Fibiger, 2008
Rustica septemmeri Fibiger, 2008

References

Micronoctuini
Moth genera